Geograph Deutschland is a web-based project, initiated in July 2008, to create a freely accessible archive of geographically located photographs of Germany.
Photographs in the Geograph Deutschland collection are chosen to illustrate geographical features all parts of Germany. It is an offshoot of Geograph Britain and Ireland which began in March 2008. All images are licensed by the contributors using the Creative Commons cc-by-sa 2.0 licence which permits modification and redistribution of the images under certain conditions.

References

Geography of Germany
Image-sharing websites
Photo archives in Germany
Outdoor locating games
German digital libraries